The Akhvakhs (also known as Akhwakh, Akhvakhtsy or G'akhevalal; ГІахьвалал in Avar) are one of the Andi–Dido peoples of Dagestan and have their own language. They call themselves Atluatii or Ashvado. Prior to 1930 Soviet ethnologists considered them to be a distinct ethnic group. Since that time they have often been classified as Avars.

Demographics 
The Akvakh live in the Akhvakhsky District of Dagestan between the Avar and Andi Rivers. In 1926 they numbered 3,683. The Akhvakhs are mainly Sunni Muslims. They face continued assimilation by the Avars. By the early 1990s it was estimated that about 8,000 people were Akhvakh, although this number includes those who have been fully assimilated as Avars but still recognize that they have Akhvakh ancestry.

They also live in Zagatala, Azerbaijan, the north-western part of Azerbaijan which is bordered on Russia and Georgia. The Akhakhdere ("Axəxdərə" in Azeri language) village is the only village that akhvahk people live. They don't consider themselves as avar, though their ID cards contain information about their nationality being "avar".

References

Sources
Wixman, Ronald. The Peoples of the USSR: An Ethnographic Handbook. (Armonk, New York: M. E. Sharpe, Inc, 1984) pp. 7–8
Olson, James S., An Ethnohistorical Dictionary of the Russian and Soviet Empires. (Westport: Greenwood Press, 1994) pp. 25–26

Ethnic groups in Azerbaijan
Ethnic groups in Dagestan
Muslim communities of Russia
Peoples of the Caucasus
Muslim communities of the Caucasus